Moussonia may refer to:
 Moussonia (gastropod), a genus of gastropods in the family Diplommatinidae
 Moussonia (plant), a genus of plants in the family Gesneriaceae
 Moussonia, a genus of gastropods in the family Oxychilidae, synonym of Daudebardia